Wentsley Scott (born 9 April 1988) is a South African rugby union player, currently playing with the . His regular position is centre.

Career

Youth

He then moved to Potchefstroom, where he played for the  Under-19 team in 2007 and their Under-21 team in 2008 and 2009.

Senior career

References

South African rugby union players
Living people
1988 births
People from George, South Africa
SWD Eagles players
Rugby union centres
Rugby union players from the Western Cape